Pasley may refer to:

People
Charles Pasley KCB (1780–1861), British soldier and military engineer who wrote the defining text on the role of the post-American revolution British Empire
Charles Pasley (engineer) CB (1824–1890), son of the above, British military engineer responsible for many public works in Australia
Kevin Pasley (born 1953), retired professional baseball player whose career spanned 12 seasons
Malcolm Pasley, FBA (1926–2004), literary scholar best known for his dedication to and publication of the works of Franz Kafka
Omar Pasley (born 1986), better known by his stage name OMI, Jamaican singer
Pasley Baronets, of Craig in the County of Dumfries, is a title in the Baronetage of Great Britain
Sir Thomas Pasley, 1st Baronet (1734–1808), senior and highly experienced British Royal Navy officer of the eighteenth century
Sir Thomas Sabine Pasley, 2nd Baronet KCB (1804–1884), officer of the British Royal Navy during the nineteenth century

Places
Pasley, Missouri, unincorporated community in the United States
Pasley, North Carolina, unincorporated community in the United States

Ships
, the name of more than one British ship of the Royal Navy
, the name of more than one United States Navy ship

See also
Paisley (disambiguation)